Joseph Leaning (1874 – 1949) was an English professional footballer who played as a goalkeeper.

References

1874 births
1949 deaths
Footballers from Grimsby
English footballers
Association football goalkeepers
Grimsby All Saints F.C. players
Grimsby Town F.C. players
Grimsby Rovers F.C. players
English Football League players